Pai Hsueh-hua (born 17 May 1955), born Pai Yueh-o, better known by her stage name Pai Bing-bing (also spelled Pai Ping-ping), is a Taiwanese singer, actress, media personality and social activist.

Life and career
Born to an impoverished family in Keelung, Pai dropped out of formal education in her teenage years. In 1973, she won a prize in a singing contest held by Taiwan Television and following this success she pursued a career in the local entertainment business. In 1975, she moved to Japan to study singing and acting. At this time she had a relationship with Japanese comics writer Ikki Kajiwara and they later married. Their daughter Pai Hsiao-yen was born in 1980 but their marriage was quickly dissolved the next year after Kajiwara engaged in an extramarital affair and committed domestic violence. Pai Bing-bing had to return to Taiwan and raised Hsiao-yen as a single mother. Since mid-1980s, Pai has been gaining popularity for her bantering style, becoming one of the best-known Taiwanese entertainers. Richard Lloyd-Parry of The Independent described Pai as the "Cilla Black of Taiwan". Besides her entertainment career, Pai also had significant investments in local catering service industry.

In 1997, Pai Hsiao-yen, then 16 years old, was kidnapped, raped, tortured and murdered. This event subsequently made the elder Pai into a social activist to advocate the use of death penalty; Pai founded the Swallow Foundation and chaired it to date to advocate capital punishment as well as provide legal support to local crime victims. Lloyd-Parry described the attention around the murder of Pai's daughter as giving Pai "a greater, though more terrible, fame than she had as an entertainer." In 2010, in the wake of the global anti-capital punishment movement, Pai successfully held a protest against former ROC Minister of Justice Wang Ching-feng, resulting in Wang's resignation and the resumption of executions in the Republic of China.

Filmography

Film

Television series

References

External links

The Swallow Foundation (in Traditional Chinese)
Pai Bing-bing Official blog (Traditional Chinese)

1955 births
Living people
Musicians from Keelung
Taiwanese film actresses
Taiwanese television personalities
Taiwanese television actresses
Taiwanese Hokkien pop singers
20th-century Taiwanese actresses
21st-century Taiwanese actresses
Japanese-language singers
Taiwanese Buddhists
Taiwanese Mandopop singers
20th-century Taiwanese women singers
21st-century Taiwanese women singers
Actresses from Keelung
Taiwanese opera actresses